The 2016–17 Purdue Boilermakers women's basketball team will represent Purdue University during the 2016–17 NCAA Division I women's basketball season. The Boilermakers, led by eleventh year head coach Sharon Versyp, play their home games at Mackey Arena and were a members of the Big Ten Conference. They finished the season 23–13, 10–6 in Big Ten play to finish in tie for fourth place. They advanced to the championship game of the Big Ten women's tournament where they lost to Maryland. They received an at-large bid of the NCAA women's tournament where they defeated Green Bay in the first round before losing to Notre Dame in an overtime thriller in the second round.

Roster

Schedule

|-
!colspan=9 style="background:#000000; color:white;"| Exhibition

|-
!colspan=9 style="background:#000000; color:white;"| Non-conference regular season

|-
!colspan=9 style="background:#000000; color:white;"| Big Ten regular season

|-
!colspan=9 style="background:#000000; color:white;"| Big Ten Women's Tournament

|-
!colspan=12 style=""|NCAA Women's Tournament

Source

Rankings
2016–17 NCAA Division I women's basketball rankings

See also
2016–17 Purdue Boilermakers men's basketball team

References

Purdue Boilermakers women's basketball seasons
Purdue
2016 in sports in Indiana
2017 in sports in Indiana
Purdue